The Fire Fighters is a Mickey Mouse short animated film first released on June 20, 1930, as part of the Mickey Mouse film series. It was the nineteenth Mickey Mouse short to be produced, the fourth of that year.

The cartoon's cast includes Mickey Mouse, Minnie Mouse and Horace Horsecollar as Mickey's horse.

Plot
Mickey Mouse, Horace Horsecollar and a team of animal firefighters are sleeping in the firehouse when the alarm bell rings. Everyone gets dressed and heads out to a burning apartment building, where Minnie Mouse is trapped on the upper floor. Mickey heroically saves her using the clothesline after she passes out. Minnie starts regaining consciousness by the time they reached the ground and realizes who her savior is. The mice couple sing out each other’s name, kissing and embracing each other as the film irises out.

Production
This film owes a debt to one of Disney's "Alice Comedies"; in the 1926 short Alice the Fire Fighter, Julius the Cat rushes to Alice's rescue when she is trapped in the burning building. The storyline is essentially the same in both cartoons.

The original outline included a sequence in which Mickey Mouse plays music at the firehouse before the alarm rings; the finished cartoon begins with the fire fighters sleeping.

The music includes a spirited rendition of the 1896 ragtime hit "There'll Be a Hot Time in the Old Town Tonight", played and sung as the fire fighters rush to the fire.

Original prints of this film had the fire scenes tinted red.

Mickey would fight fire again in 1935's Mickey's Fire Brigade.

Voice actors
 Mickey Mouse: Walt Disney
 Minnie Mouse: Marcellite Garner

Reception
In Mickey's Movies: The Theatrical Films of Mickey Mouse, Gijs Grob points out, "The Fire Fighters is the first Mickey Mouse cartoon since The Gallopin' Gaucho to tell a straightforward story. The animation may be primitive and rather crude, and some of the movement rather slow, but the cartoon is packed with gags, and leads to an exciting finale that spotlights Mickey's heroic character... The Fire Fighters is one of the best of the early Mickey Mouse cartoons, and certainly Mickey's best short of 1930."

On the Disney Film Project, Ryan Kilpatrick writes: "The Fire Fighters is a great use of the character in his new role as the loveable loser. The bravado filled Mickey of the early shorts would not have worked in this cartoon, but Mickey as the hapless fire chief works really well... Mickey’s personality is great in this as well, showing his frustration with the hydrant or the fear of whether he’ll be able to save Minnie or not. He really is a character here, not just a collection of drawings, and that’s the way he's been evolving throughout this period."

Motion Picture News (November 15, 1930): "Here's another reason why the Mickey Mouse comedies maintain their lead in the comedy field, even though the public is pretty much fed on some of the repetitious stuff in cartoons generally. The laughs come thick and fast. Mickey is a fireman in this and with his trusty company dashes out to save the fair young maiden. He does it to the tune of a lot of laughs."

Home media
The short was released on December 2, 2002 on Walt Disney Treasures: Mickey Mouse in Black and White.

Television
The short was also seen on The Mickey Mouse Club (Season 1, Episode 86).

See also
Mickey Mouse (film series)

References

External links
 
 

Mickey Mouse short films
1930s Disney animated short films
1930 short films
American black-and-white films
1930s English-language films
1930 animated films
1930 films
Films produced by Walt Disney
American comedy short films
Columbia Pictures short films
Columbia Pictures animated short films
Films about firefighting
1930s American films